The Tour de Kyushu will be an annual professional road bicycle racing stage race held in Kyushu, Japan for the first time in October 2023, as part of the UCI Asia Tour. It is rated by the International Cycling Union (UCI) as a 2.1 category race. The race was created to showcase the recovery from recent disasters in Kyushu.

2023 edition
The main sponsor for the 2023 edition will be the Mynavi Corporation. Three-stages will make up the race plus a pre race non-UCI rated criterium. The Criterium will be multiple laps of a small city circuit for a total of 45km. Stage 1 will be a 145km route from Kitakyushu to Ōmuta. Stage 2 will be 120km and be on hilly terrain going through the Aso Mountains, starting in Minami Oguni and ending in Minami Aso. The final stage of the race will be a stage for the sprinters of 135km starting with a decent followed by laps of a circuit around Hita to finish.

In preparation for the Race in 2023 the organisers ran a virtual race with segments from each of the stages.

References

External links
 

Cycle races in Japan
UCI Asia Tour races